John George Dalton (15 April 1876 – 12 March 1923) was an Australian rules footballer who played for the Fitzroy Football Club in the Victorian Football League (VFL).

Making his senior debut in 1896, the year before the inaugural VFL season, Dalton was a half back flanker in Fitzroy's 1898 premiership team. He missed out on Fitzroy's premiership the following season due to injury.

Dalton's brother Bill also played in Fitzroy's 1898 premiership team.

References
Holmesby, Russell and Main, Jim (2007). The Encyclopedia of AFL Footballers. 7th ed. Melbourne: Bas Publishing.

External links

1876 births
1923 deaths
Australian rules footballers from Melbourne
Fitzroy Football Club (VFA) players
Fitzroy Football Club players
Fitzroy Football Club Premiership players
One-time VFL/AFL Premiership players
People from Prahran, Victoria